Latinos for Trump is a coalition of Latino supporters of Donald Trump, formed in the U.S. state of Florida in June 2019.

Leadership
Marco Gutierrez is a co-founder.

Enrique Tarrio is the Florida state director of the grassroots organization, and also chairman of the Proud Boys.

Activities
A Latinos for Trump demonstration was held in Miami on October 18, 2020.

Reception
Following Trump's overperformance with Latino voters in the 2020 United States presidential election, USA Today opinion columnist Ruben Navarrette Jr. expressed frustration with the results, writing, "The whole idea of Latinos for Trump is counterintuitive, like chickens for Colonel Sanders. Trump is the most anti-Latino president Americans have seen in nearly seven decades, since before we even started keeping track of the Latino vote in 1960."

See also
 George Lombardi
 Taco trucks on every corner

References

External links

 

2019 establishments in Florida
Conservative organizations in the United States
Presidency of Donald Trump
Political organizations established in 2019
Latino conservatism in the United States